Sergei (or Sergo) Kutivadze (16 October 1944 – 7 June 2017) was a Georgian and Soviet football player and coach. After retiring from playing, he coached FC Dinamo Tbilisi and FC Torpedo Kutaisi.

International career
Kutivadze played his only game for the USSR on 4 September 1965 in a friendly against Yugoslavia.

External links
 
  Profile

1944 births
2017 deaths
Sportspeople from Almaty
Soviet footballers
Soviet Union international footballers
FC Dinamo Tbilisi players
FC Torpedo Kutaisi players
Footballers from Georgia (country)
FC Dinamo Tbilisi managers
Association football midfielders
Football managers from Georgia (country)